Theddingworth railway station was a railway station serving  Theddingworth in the English county of Leicestershire. It was opened on the Rugby and Stamford Railway in 1850.

History
Parliamentary approval was gained in 1846 by the directors of the London and Birmingham Railway for a branch from Rugby to the Syston and Peterborough Railway near Stamford. In the same year the company became part of the London and North Western Railway. The section from Rugby to Market Harborough, which included Theddingworth, opened in 1850.

Although the official opening was not till 1 May 1850, some services may have been run on 29 April for the Market Harborough fair. Initially there were three train services daily each way.

A neat, compact station house was provided on the up (Rugby) side next to the level crossing with the signal box opposite.  On the opposite down platform was a small timber waiting-room with a substantial awning.

Originally single track, the line was doubled at the end of 1878.  There was a siding on the up (Rugby) side with a horse loading bay behind the railway offices and, in the Rugby direction, there was a long head shunt.  At some time early in the century the signal box caught fire and a lack of running water made it difficult to put out. It was rebuilt with a modern superstructure on the original LNWR brick base.

At grouping in 1923 it became part of the London Midland and Scottish Railway. At the end of the 19th century there were eight trains on the line each day, four of them stopping at the intermediate stations.  Around 1950 the service was six or seven trains a day, but this business disappeared in the next decade.  Freight service was discontinued on 6 April 1964, and passenger services on 6 June 1966.

Filming for the 1967 film Robbery took place to the east of Theddingworth station. Scenes of the actual robbery were shot there.

There is still a Station Road with a pronounced dogleg where it crossed the track.  The station building has been carefully preserved by its present owners, along with the signal box, waiting room and level crossing gates.

References

External links
 Theddingworth Station down side waiting room today
 Theddingworth Signal Box

Former London and North Western Railway stations
Railway stations in Great Britain opened in 1850
Railway stations in Great Britain closed in 1966
Disused railway stations in Leicestershire
Beeching closures in England